Deubner is a surname. Notable people with the surname include:

Alexander Deubner (1899– 1946), Catholic priest after Orthodox one and again priest of the Russian Catholic Church of the Byzantine Rite
Brett Deubner (born 1968), American violist
Ivan Deubner (1873–1936), Russian Catholic priest who converted to the Russian Catholic Church of Byzantine rite
Otfried Deubner (1908–2001), German classical archaeologist and diplomat